Sir Frederick William Fison, 1st Baronet (4 December 1847 – 20 December 1927)
was an English mill-owner and Conservative politician who sat in the House of Commons from 1895 to 1906.

Fison was born at Bradford, the son of William Fison a manufacturer and his wife Fanny Whitaker. He was educated at Rugby School and Christ Church, Oxford. He was a spinner and manufacturer and became a Justice of the Peace (J.P.) and Deputy Lieutenant.

At the 1885 general election, Fison stood unsuccessfully for Parliament in Otley
and he was unsuccessful again in Buckrose in 1892. He finally entered the Commons at the 1895 general election, when he was elected as Member of Parliament for Doncaster, holding that seat until his defeat at the 1906 general election. He was created a baronet on 27 July 1905.

Fison died at the age of 80.

Fison married Isabella Crossley, daughter of Joseph Crossley, on 23 April 1872. Their son William Fison was an Olympic rower.

References

External links 
 

1847 births
1927 deaths
Alumni of Christ Church, Oxford
Baronets in the Baronetage of the United Kingdom
Conservative Party (UK) MPs for English constituencies
Directors of the Great Northern Railway (Great Britain)
People educated at Rugby School
Politicians from Bradford
UK MPs 1895–1900
UK MPs 1900–1906